Breast cancer management takes different approaches depending on physical and biological characteristics of the disease, as well as the age, over-all health and personal preferences of the patient. Treatment types can be classified into local therapy (surgery and radiotherapy) and systemic treatment (chemo-, endocrine, and targeted therapies). Local therapy is most efficacious in early stage breast cancer, while systemic therapy is generally justified in advanced and metastatic disease, or in diseases with specific phenotypes.

Historically, breast cancer was treated with radical surgery alone. Advances in the understanding of the natural course of breast cancer as well as the development of systemic therapies allowed for the use of breast-conserving surgeries, however, the nomenclature of viewing non-surgical management from the viewpoint of the definitive surgery lends to two adjectives connected with treatment timelines: adjuvant (after surgery) and neoadjuvant (before surgery).

The mainstay of breast cancer management is surgery for the local and regional tumor, followed (or preceded) by a combination of chemotherapy, radiotherapy, endocrine (hormone) therapy, and targeted therapy. Research is ongoing for the use of immunotherapy in breast cancer management.

Management of breast cancer is undertaken by a multidisciplinary team, including medical-, radiation-, and surgical- oncologists, and is guided by national and international guidelines. Factors such as treatment, oncologist, hospital and stage of your breast cancer decides the cost of breast cancer one must pay.

Staging 
Staging breast cancer is the initial step to help physicians determine the most appropriate course of treatment. As of 2016, guidelines incorporated biologic factors, such as tumor grade, cellular proliferation rate, estrogen and progesterone receptor expression, human epidermal growth factor 2 (HER2) expression, and gene expression profiling  into the staging system. Cancer that has spread beyond the breast and the lymph nodes is classified as Stage IV, or metastatic cancer, and requires mostly systemic treatment.

The TNM staging system of a cancer is a measurement of the physical extent of the tumor and its spread, where:
 T stands for the main (primary) tumor (range of T0-T4)
 N stands for spread to nearby lymph nodes (range of N0-N3)
 M stands for metastasis (spread to distant parts of the body; either M0 or M1)
If the stage is based on removal of the cancer with surgery and review by the pathologist, the letter p (for pathologic) or yp (pathologic after neoadjuvant therapy) may appear before the T and N letters. If the stage is based on clinical assessment using physical exam and imaging, the letter c (for clinical) may appear. The TNM information is then combined to give the cancer an overall stage. Stages are expressed in Roman numerals from stage I (the least advanced stage) to stage IV (the most advanced stage). Non-invasive cancer (carcinoma in situ) is listed as stage 0.

TNM staging, in combination with histopathology, grade and genomic profiling, is used for the purpose of prognosis, and to determine whether additional treatment is warranted.

Classification 

Breast cancer is classified into three major subtypes for the purpose of predicting  response to treatment. These are determined by the presence or absence of receptors on the cells of the tumor. The three major subgroups are:
 Luminal-type, which are tumors positive for hormone receptors (estrogen or progesterone receptor). This subtype suggests a response to endocrine therapy.
 HER2-type, which are positive for over-expression of the HER2 receptor. ER and PR can be positive or negative. This subtype receives targeted therapy.
 Basal-type, or Triple Negative (TN), which are negative for all three major receptor types
Additional classification schema are used for prognosis and include histopathology, grade, stage, and genomic profiling.

Surgery

Surgery is the primary management for breast cancer. Depending on staging and biologic characteristics of the tumor, surgery can be a lumpectomy (removal of the lump only), a mastectomy, or a modified radical mastectomy. Lymph nodes are often included in the scope of breast tumor removal. Surgery can be performed before or after receiving systemic therapy. Women who test positive for faulty BRCA1 or BRCA2 genes can choose to have risk-reducing surgery before the cancer appears.

Lumpectomy techniques are increasingly utilized for breast-conservation cancer surgery. Studies indicate that for patients with a single tumor smaller than 4 cm, a lumpectomy with negative surgical margins may be as effective as a mastectomy. Prior to a lumpectomy, a needle-localization of the lesion with placement of a guidewire may be performed, sometimes by an interventional radiologist if the area being removed was detected by mammography or ultrasound, and sometimes by the surgeon if the lesion can be directly palpated.

However, mastectomy may be the preferred treatment in certain instances:

 Two or more tumors exist in different areas of the breast (a "multifocal" cancer)
 The breast has previously received radiotherapy
 The tumor is large relative to the size of the breast
 The patient has had scleroderma or another disease of the connective tissue, which can complicate radiotherapy
 The patient lives in an area where radiotherapy is inaccessible
 The patient wishes to avoid systemic therapy
 The patient is apprehensive about the risk of local recurrence after lumpectomy
Specific types of mastectomy can also include: skin-sparing, nipple-sparing, subcutaneous, and prophylactic.

Standard practice requires the surgeon to establish that the tissue removed in the operation has margins clear of cancer, indicating that the cancer has been completely excised. Additional surgery may be necessary if the removed tissue does not have clear margins, sometimes requiring removal of part of the pectoralis major muscle, which is the main muscle of the anterior chest wall.

During the operation, the lymph nodes in the axilla are also considered for removal. In the past, large axillary operations took out 10 to 40 nodes to establish whether cancer had spread. This had the unfortunate side effect of frequently causing lymphedema of the arm on the same side, as the removal of this many lymph nodes affected lymphatic drainage. More recently, the technique of sentinel lymph node (SLN) dissection has become popular, as it requires the removal of far fewer lymph nodes, resulting in fewer side effects while achieving the same 10-year survival as its predecessor. The sentinel lymph node is the first node that drains the tumor, and subsequent SLN mapping can save 65–70% of patients with breast cancer from having a complete lymph node dissection for what could turn out to be a negative nodal basin. Advances in SLN mapping over the past decade have increased the accuracy of detecting Sentinel Lymph Node from 80% using blue dye alone to between 92% and 98% using combined modalities. SLN biopsy is indicated for patients with T1 and T2 lesions (<5 cm) and carries a number of recommendations for use on patient subgroups. Recent trends continue to favor less radical axillar node resection even in the presence of some metastases in the sentinel node.

A meta-analysis has found that in people with operable primary breast cancer, compared to being treated with axillary lymph node dissection, being treated with lesser axillary surgery (such as axillary sampling or sentinel lymph node biopsy) does not lessen the chance of survival. Overall survival is slightly reduced by receiving radiotherapy alone when compared to axillary lymph node dissection. In the management of primary breast cancer, having no axillary lymph nodes removed is linked to increased risk of regrowth of cancer. Treatment with axillary lymph node dissection has been found to give an increased risk of lymphoedema, pain, reduced arm movement and numbness when compared to those treated with sentinel lymph node dissection or no axillary surgery.

Ovary removal 
Prophylactic oophorectomy may be prudent in women who are at a high risk for recurrence or are seeking an alternative to endocrine therapy as it removes the primary source of estrogen production in pre-menopausal women. Women who are carriers of a BRCA mutation have an increased risk of both breast and ovarian cancers and may choose to have their ovaries removed prophylactically as well.

Breast reconstruction 

Breast reconstruction surgery is the rebuilding of the breast after breast cancer surgery, and is included in holistic approaches to cancer management to address identity and emotional aspects of the disease. Reconstruction can take place at the same time as cancer-removing surgery, or months to years later. Some women decide not to have reconstruction or opt for a prosthesis instead.

Investigational surgical management
Cryoablation is an experimental therapy available for women with small or early-stage breast cancer. The treatment freezes, then defrosts tumors using small needles so that only the harmful tissue is damaged and ultimately dies. This technique may provide an alternative to more invasive surgeries, potentially limiting side effects.

Radiation therapy
Radiation therapy is an adjuvant treatment for most women who have undergone lumpectomy and for some women who have mastectomy surgery. In these cases the purpose of radiation is to reduce the chance that the cancer will recur locally (within the breast or axilla). Radiation therapy involves using high-energy X-rays or gamma rays that target a tumor or post surgery tumor site. This radiation is very effective in killing cancer cells that may remain after surgery or recur where the tumor was removed.

Radiation therapy can be delivered by external beam radiotherapy, brachytherapy (internal radiotherapy), or by intra-operative radiotherapy (IORT). In the case of external beam radiotherapy, X-rays are delivered from outside the body by a machine called a Linear Accelerator or Linac. In contrast, brachytherapy involves the precise placement of radiation source(s) directly at the treatment site. IORT includes a one-time dose of radiation administered with breast surgery. Radiation therapy is important in the use of breast-conserving therapy because it reduces the risk of local recurrence.

Radiation therapy eliminates the microscopic cancer cells that may remain near the area where the tumor was surgically removed. The dose of radiation must be strong enough to ensure the elimination of cancer cells. However, radiation affects normal cells and cancer cells alike, causing some damage to the normal tissue around where the tumor was. Healthy tissue can repair itself, while cancer cells do not repair themselves as well as normal cells. For this reason, radiation treatments are given over an extended period, enabling the healthy tissue to heal. Treatments using external beam radiotherapy are typically given over a period of five to seven weeks, performed five days a week. Recent large trials (UK START and Canadian) have confirmed that shorter treatment courses, typically over three to four weeks, result in equivalent cancer control and side effects as the more protracted treatment schedules. Each treatment takes about 15 minutes. A newer approach, called 'accelerated partial breast irradiation' (APBI), uses brachytherapy to deliver the radiation in a much shorter period of time. APBI delivers radiation to only the immediate region surrounding the original tumor and can typically be completed over the course of one week.

Indications for radiation
Radiation treatment is mainly effective in reducing the risk of local relapse in the affected breast. Therefore, it is recommended in most cases of breast conserving surgeries and less frequently after mastectomy. Indications for radiation treatment are constantly evolving. Patients treated in Europe have been more likely in the past to be recommended adjuvant radiation after breast cancer surgery as compared to patients in North America. Radiation therapy is usually recommended for all patients who had lumpectomy, quadrant-resection. Radiation therapy is usually not indicated in patients with advanced (stage IV disease) except for palliation of symptoms like bone pain or fungating lesions.

In general recommendations would include radiation:
As part of breast conserving therapy.
After mastectomy for patients with higher risk of recurrence because of conditions such as a large primary tumor or substantial involvement of the lymph nodes.

Other factors which may influence adding adjuvant radiation therapy:
Tumor close to or involving the margins on pathology specimen
Multiple areas of tumor (multicentric disease)
Microscopic invasion of lymphatic or vascular tissues
Microcopic invasion of the skin, nipple/areola, or underlying pectoralis major muscle
Patients with extension out of the substance of a LN
Inadequate numbers of axillary LN sampled

Types of radiotherapy

Radiotherapy can be delivered in many ways but is most commonly produced by a linear accelerator.

This usually involves treating the whole breast in the case of breast lumpectomy or the whole chest wall in the case of mastectomy. Lumpectomy patients with early-stage breast cancer may be eligible for a newer, shorter form of treatment called "breast brachytherapy". This approach allows physicians to treat only part of the breast in order to spare healthy tissue from unnecessary radiation.

Improvements in computers and treatment delivery technology have led to more complex radiotherapy treatment options. One such new technology is using IMRT (intensity modulated radiation therapy), which can change the shape and intensity of the radiation beam making "beamlets" at different points across and inside the breast. This allows for better dose distribution within the breast while minimizing dose to healthy organs such as the lung or heart. However, there is yet to be a demonstrated difference in treatment outcomes (both tumor recurrence and level of side effects) for IMRT in breast cancer when compared to conventional radiotherapy treatment. In addition, conventional radiotherapy can also deliver similar dose distributions utilizing modern computer dosimetry planning and equipment. External beam radiation therapy treatments for breast cancer are typically given every day, five days a week, for five to 10 weeks.

Within the past decade, a new approach called accelerated partial breast irradiation (APBI) has gained popularity. APBI is used to deliver radiation as part of breast conservation therapy. It treats only the area where the tumor was surgically removed, plus adjacent tissue. APBI reduces the length of treatment to just five days, compared to the typical six or seven weeks for whole breast irradiation.

APBI treatments can be given as brachytherapy or external beam with a linear accelerator. These treatments are usually limited to women with well-defined tumors that have not spread. A meta-analysis of randomised trials of partial breast irradiation (PBI) vs. whole breast irradiation (WBI) as part of breast conserving therapy demonstrated a reduction in non-breast-cancer and overall mortality.

In breast brachytherapy, the radiation source is placed inside the breast, treating the cavity from the inside out. There are several different devices that deliver breast brachytherapy. Some use a single catheter and balloon to deliver the radiation. Other devices utilize multiple catheters to deliver radiation.

A study is currently underway by the National Surgical Breast and Bowel Project (NSABP) to determine whether limiting radiation therapy to only the tumor site following lumpectomy is as effective as radiating the whole breast.

New technology has also allowed more precise delivery of radiotherapy in a portable fashion — for example in the operating theatre. Targeted intraoperative radiotherapy (TARGIT) is a method of delivering therapeutic radiation from within the breast using a portable X-ray generator called Intrabeam.

The TARGIT-A trial was an international randomised controlled non-inferiority phase III clinical trial led from University College London. 28 centres in 9 countries accrued 2,232 patients to test whether TARGIT can replace the whole course of radiotherapy in selected patients. The TARGIT-A trial results found that the difference between the two treatments was 0.25% (95% CI -1.0 to 1.5) i.e., at most 1.5% worse or at best 1.0% better with single dose TARGIT than with standard course of several weeks of external beam radiotherapy. In the TARGIT-B trial, as the TARGIT technique is precisely aimed and given immediately after surgery, in theory it could be able provide a better boost dose to the tumor bed as suggested in phase II studies.

Systemic therapy
Systemic therapy uses medications to treat cancer cells throughout the body. Any combination of systemic treatments may be used to treat breast cancer. Standard of care systemic treatments include chemotherapy, endocrine therapy and targeted therapy.

Chemotherapy 

Chemotherapy (drug treatment for cancer) may be used before surgery, after surgery, or instead of surgery for those cases in which surgery is considered unsuitable. Chemotherapy is justified for cancers whose prognosis after surgery is poor without additional intervention.

Hormonal therapy 

Patients with estrogen receptor positive tumors are candidates for receiving endocrine therapy to reduce chance of relapse or of a new primary breast cancer. Endocrine therapy is usually administered after surgery, chemotherapy and radiotherapy have been given, but can also occur in the neoadjuvant or non-surgical setting. Hormonal treatments include:

 Tamoxifen is typically given to premenopausal women to inhibit activity of estrogen receptors.
 Aromatase inhibitors are typically given to postmenopausal women to lower the amount of bioavailable estrogen in their systems.
 Estrogen cycling was reported at the 31st annual San Antonio Breast Cancer Symposium. About a third of the 66 participants - women with metastatic breast cancer that had developed resistance to standard estrogen-lowering therapy - a daily dose of estrogen could stop the growth of their tumors or even cause them to shrink. If study participants experienced disease progression on estrogen, they could go back to an aromatase inhibitor that they were previously resistant to and see a benefit - their tumors were once again inhibited by estrogen deprivation. That effect sometimes wore off after several months, but then the tumors might again be sensitive to estrogen therapy. In fact, some patients have cycled back and forth between estrogen and an aromatase inhibitor for several years. PET (positron emission tomography) scans before starting estrogen and again 24 hours later predicted those tumors which responded to estrogen therapy: the responsive tumors showed an increased glucose uptake, called a PET flare. The mechanism of action is uncertain, although estrogen reduces the amount of a tumor-promoting hormone called insulin-like growth factor-1 (IGF1).
 Anabolic steroids such as testosterone, fluoxymesterone, drostanolone propionate, epitiostanol, and mepitiostane have historically been used to treat breast cancer because of their antiestrogenic effects in the breasts but are now rarely if ever used due to their virilizing side effects.

Targeted therapy 

In patients whose cancer expresses an over-abundance of the HER2 protein, a monoclonal antibody known as trastuzumab (Herceptin) is used to block the activity of the HER2 protein in breast cancer cells, slowing their growth.
In the advanced cancer setting, trastuzumab use in combination with chemotherapy can both delay cancer growth as well as improve the recipient's survival. Pertuzumab may work synergistically with trastuzumab on the expanded EGFR family of receptors, although it is currently only standard of care for metastatic disease.

Neratinib has been approved by the FDA for extended adjuvant treatment of early stage HER2-positive breast cancer.

PARP inhibitors are used in the metastatic setting, and are being investigated for use in the non-metastatic setting through clinical trials.

Approved antibody-drug conjugates: trastuzumab emtansine (2013), trastuzumab deruxtecan (2019), sacituzumab govitecan (2020).

Treatment response assessment

Medical imaging

Managing side effects
Drugs and radiotherapy given for cancer can cause unpleasant side effects such as nausea and vomiting, mouth sores, dermatitis, and menopausal symptoms. Around a third of patients with cancer use complementary therapies, including homeopathic medicines, to try to reduce these side effects.

Insomnia
It was believed that one would find a bi-directional relationship between insomnia and pain, but instead it was found that trouble sleeping was more likely a cause, rather than a consequence, of pain in patients with cancer. An early intervention to manage sleep would overall relieve patient with side effects.

Approximately 40 percent of menopausal women experience sleep disruption, often in the form of difficulty with sleep initiation and frequent nighttime awakenings. There is a study, first to show sustained benefits in sleep quality from gabapentin, which Rochester researchers already have demonstrated alleviates hot flashes.

Hot flushes
Lifestyle adjustments are usually suggested first to manage hot flushes (or flashes) due to endocrine therapy. This can include avoiding triggers such as alcohol, caffeine and smoking. If hot flashes continue, and depending on their frequency and severity, several drugs can be effective in some patients, in particular SNRIs such as venlafaxine, also oxybutinin and others.

Complementary medicines that contain phytoestrogens are not recommended for breast cancer patients as they may stimulate oestrogen receptor-positive tumours.

Lymphedema
Some patients develop lymphedema, as a result of axillary node dissection or of radiation treatment to the lymph nodes. Although traditional recommendations limited exercise, a new study shows that participating in a safe, structured weight-lifting routine can help women with lymphedema take control of their symptoms and reap the many rewards that resistance training has on their overall health as they begin life as a cancer survivor. It recommends that women start with a slowly progressive program, supervised by a certified fitness professional, in order to learn how to do these types of exercises properly. Women with lymphedema should also wear a well-fitting compression garment during all exercise sessions.

Upper-limb dysfunction 
Upper-limb dysfunction is a common side effect of breast cancer treatment. Shoulder range of motion can be impaired after surgery. Exercise can meaningfully improve should range of motion in women with breast cancer. An exercise programme can be started early after surgery, if it does not negatively affect wound drainage.

Side effects of radiation therapy
External beam radiation therapy is a non-invasive treatment with some short term and some longer-term side effects. Patients undergoing some weeks of treatment usually experience fatigue caused by the healthy tissue repairing itself and aside from this there can be no side effects at all. However many breast cancer patients develop a suntan-like change in skin color in the exact area being treated. As with a suntan, this darkening of the skin usually returns to normal in the one to two months after treatment. In some cases permanent changes in color and texture of the skin is experienced. Other side effects sometimes experienced with radiation can include:
muscle stiffness
mild swelling
tenderness in the area
lymphedema

After surgery, radiation and other treatments have been completed, many patients notice the affected breast seems smaller or seems to have shrunk. This is basically due to the removal of tissue during the lumpectomy operation.

The use of adjuvant radiation has significant potential effects if the patient has to later undergo breast reconstruction surgery. Fibrosis of chest wall skin from radiation negatively affects skin elasticity and makes tissue expansion techniques difficult. Traditionally most patients are advised to defer immediate breast reconstruction when adjuvant radiation is planned and are most often recommended surgery involving autologous tissue reconstruction rather than breast implants.

Studies suggest APBI may reduce the side effects associated with radiation therapy, because it treats only the tumor cavity and the surrounding tissue. In particular, a device that uses multiple catheters and allows modulation of the radiation dose delivered by each of these catheters has been shown to reduce harm to nearby, healthy tissue.

See also 
 ALMANAC, Axillary Lymphatic Mapping Against Nodal Axillary Clearance trial

References

External links  
 
 Prevention and treatment of breast cancer by suppressing aromatase activity and expression 

Breast cancer